Ian Matthew Fitzpatrick (born 22 September 1980) in Manchester, England, is an English retired professional footballer who played as a striker for Manchester United, Halifax Town and Shrewsbury Town in the Football League.
F.A. National School Graduate, E.S.F.A, England U15-U18 (18 Caps).

He is the younger brother of former Blackburn Rovers and Hartlepool United midfielder Lee Fitzpatrick.

Ian now works as a Premiership Academy Coach at Manchester City Football Club.

References

1980 births
Living people
Footballers from Manchester
English footballers
Association football midfielders
Manchester United F.C. players
Halifax Town A.F.C. players
Shrewsbury Town F.C. players
Leigh Genesis F.C. players
Forest Green Rovers F.C. players
Droylsden F.C. players
Northwich Victoria F.C. players
Radcliffe F.C. players
Ashton United F.C. players
Salford City F.C. players
English Football League players
Manchester City F.C. non-playing staff